The 1431 papal conclave (March 2–3) convened after the death of Pope Martin V and elected as his successor Cardinal Gabriele Condulmer, who took the name Eugene IV. It was the first papal conclave held after the end of the Great Western Schism.

List of participants

Pope Martin V died on February 20, 1431. At the time of his death, there were 20 publicly known members of the College of Cardinals, but only 18 were considered to be valid electors. Fourteen of them participated in the conclave:

The Council of Constance confirmed the cardinals created by all three obediences of the time of the Schism. Seven participants were named cardinal by Pope Martin V, three by "Pisan" Antipope John XXIII, two by "Roman" Pope Gregory XII, one by "Roman" Pope Innocent VII and one by Antipope Benedict XIII of Avignon.

Absentees

Four electors did not participate in this conclave:

All the absentee electors were created by Martin V, except Pierre de Foix, who was elevated by Pisan Antipope John XXIII.

Non-electors

Pope Martin V initiated the custom of creating cardinals without publishing their names at the time (similar to in pectore). At the time of his death the names of two of his secret nominees remained unpublished and, therefore, they were not regarded as members of the Sacred College. They were Juan Casanova, administrator of Elne, and Guillaume Ragenel de Montfort, bishop of Saint-Malo, and they both were later created again by Eugene IV. However, two cardinals also created initially in pectore but later published were not allowed to participate in this conclave, because some necessary rites had not been accomplished at the death of Martin V:

The election of Pope Eugene IV

The Mass of the Holy Spirit was sung on Thursday March 1, 1431 by Cardinal Giordano Orsini, the Bishop of Albano, prior Cardinalium.  On March 2 all cardinals present in Rome entered the conclave in Santa Maria sopra Minerva. On 2 March,  the electors prepared and subscribed the conclave capitulation. The terms of the Capitulation, which contained at least eight clauses, included:

 Half of papal revenue was to be shared with the College of Cardinals
 No major issues were to be decided without the consent of the College

The first scrutiny took place on the following day, 3 March, and ended with unanimous election of Cardinal Gabriele Condulmer, who took the name of Eugene IV. On Sunday 11 March he was solemnly crowned on the steps of the patriarchal Vatican Basilica by Cardinal Alfonso Carrillo de Albornoz of S. Eustachio, the Cardinal Protodeacon.

Notes

Sources
Francis Burkle-Young “Papal elections in the Fifteenth Century: the election of Eugenius IV
Sede Vacante 1431
Annales ecclesiastici
Konrad Eubel: Hierarchia Catholica, Vol. I-II, Monasterium 1913-1914

Bibliography

 F. Petruccelli della Gattina, Histoire diplomatique des conclaves Volume I (Paris: 1864), 236-252.
 William Cornwallis Cartwright, On the Constitution of Papal Conclaves (Edinburgh 1878) 125-129.
 Ferdinand Gregorovius, The History of Rome in the Middle Ages (translated from the fourth German edition by A. Hamilton) Volume 7 part 1 [Book XIII, Chapter 1] (London 1900) 22-26. 
 Ludwig Pastor, History of the Popes (tr. R.F. Kerr) Volume I (St. Louis 1906).
 Peter Partner, The Papal State under Martin V (London 1958).

1431
15th-century elections
1431
1431 in Europe
15th-century Catholicism
15th century in Europe